Zara Foley (born 11 April 2002) is an Irish professional footballer who plays for Women's National League team Cork City, and the Republic of Ireland women's national football team, as a defender.

Club career
Foley joined Cork City from Lakewood Athletic in July 2018. She made her debut for Cork in a 3−0 defeat against Peamount United. In the 2019 season she scored her first goal in a 7−1 win against Kilkenny United, scoring in the third minute. 
In the 2020 season she played a pivotal role in guiding Cork to 4th place. They also reached the 2020 FAI Women's Cup Final, where they were defeated 6−0 by Peamount United.

International career
Foley was called up to the Irish senior women's squad for two friendlies against Portugal in January 2018. She was an unused substitute in a 1−0 loss.

She was again called up to the senior squad in June of that year, and was again an unused substitute in a 1−0 loss to Norway, in their 2019 World Cup qualification match. She would go on to make her debut against Poland in October, coming on as a 90th minute substitute for Ruesha Littlejohn.
In 2018 Foley was called up for four Under-17 European Championship qualification matches for the Ireland U17 team.
In 2019 she played for the U19 team in a 2020 Under-19 European Championship qualification match against Netherlands, she played  all 90 minutes in a 6−0 loss.

Personal life
Foley is from Ballincollig. Her older brother Dylan played soccer for Cork City and Cobh Ramblers.

References

Republic of Ireland women's association footballers
Living people
2002 births
Republic of Ireland women's international footballers
Cork City W.F.C. players
Association footballers from County Cork
Women's National League (Ireland) players
Women's association football defenders
Republic of Ireland women's youth international footballers